Cognitive theory may refer to:
 Cognitive psychology,  the study of mental processes
 Cognitive science
 Theory of cognitive development, Jean Piaget's theory of development and the theories which spawned from it
Two factor theory of emotion, another cognitive theory